Synophis insulomontanus, known commonly as the mountain fishing snake or the mountain shadow snake, is a species of snake in the family Colubridae. The species is endemic to northwestern South America.

Geographic range
S. insulomontanus is found in Huánuco Region, Peru.

Habitat

Behavior

Diet
The diet of S. insulomontanus is unknown. Despite the allusion to fishing in one of its common names, there is no evidence that the species eats fish.

References

Further reading
Torres-Carvajal, Omar; Echevarría, Lourdes; Venegas, Pablo Javier; Chávez, Germán; Camper, Jeffrey (2015). "Description and phylogeny of three new species of Synophis (Colubridae, Dipsadinae) from the tropical Andes in Ecuador and Peru". ZooKeys 546: 153–179. (Synophis insulomontanus, new species). (in English, with an abstract in Spanish).

Colubrids
Snakes of South America
Reptiles of Peru
Endemic fauna of Peru
Reptiles described in 2015